Denis-François Camusat (1697 – 1732) was a French historian, grand nephew of Nicholas Camusat.

Camusat produced works such as Hist. Critiques des Journaux qui s'impriment en France and Bibliotheque des Livres nouveaux.

Sources
Denis-François Camusat entry on The general biographical dictionary - Revised by A. Chalmers

18th-century French historians
1697 births
1732 deaths
French male non-fiction writers
18th-century French male writers